Beeche is a surname. Notable people with the surname include:

Ricardo Castro Beeche (1894–1967), Costa Rican lawyer, politician, and writer
William Beeche (fl. 1386), English politician

See also
Beech
Beecher (surname)